Strother Memorial Chapel is a historic chapel at 1201 Van Drive in Seminole, Oklahoma. It is located in the Maple Grove Cemetery.

It was built in 1928 in honor of O. D. Strother, a founding father of the local oil industry. Over the following 70 years it fell into disrepair, and then was restored through the efforts of the Maple Grove Cemetery Association and the Seminole Historical Society. The chapel was added to the National Register in 2003.

References

Seminole Strother
Seminole Strother
Seminole Strother
Seminole Strother
National Register of Historic Places in Seminole County, Oklahoma